Taiwan Fund for Children and Families (TFCF) is a nonprofit organization in Taiwan that provides services to vulnerable children and families who are below 18 years of age. “Livelihood Supports” and “Child Protection” are its two main target programs. Regardless of race, religion and gender, TFCF was founded in 1950 with a helping hand from Christian Children's Fund, a NGO from Virginia, United States. It went independent during 1985. Presently, it has 24 branch offices, 1 Ta-Tung Children's Home and other 11 Affiliates, 3 Non-profit Kindergartens as well as 7 overseas branch offices in Mongolia, Kyrgyzstan, Kingdom of Eswatini, Vietnam, Cambodia, Jordan, and Philippines.  They also collaborate with ChildFund International USA, Children Believe, ChildFund Australia, and PLAN BØRNEfonden to provide children sponsorship program to help over 50,000 needy children across 34 countries.

History 
1938 - China’s Children Fund (CCF) was established in Richmond, Virginia, by the Christians in the United States.
1950 - Set up the first family-style orphanage in Taiwan and took over Ta-Tung Children’s Home.
1951 - CCF changed its name to Christian Children’s Fund, Christian Children’s Fund of Taiwan.
1964 - CCF Taiwan Field Office was formally established and 23 branch offices were set up gradually to provide services to needy children and families in Taiwan.
1985 - CCF/Taiwan became fully independent from Christian Children’s Fund and no longer received financial support from foreign donors.
1987 - CCF/Taiwan launched the Foreign Children Sponsorship Program and started sponsoring children in Asia, America, and Africa. It provided Child Protection Program in Taiwan.
1999 - Changed its name to Chinese Fund for Children and Families/Taiwan (CCF/Taiwan). Received the National Social Welfare Prize issued by the government.
2002 - Changed its name to Taiwan Fund for Children and Families (TFCF).
2004 – Mongolia Branch Office was registered as their first Branch Office abroad.
2008 – Started providing services in China.
2012 – Kyrgyzstan Branch Office was registered as their second Branch Office abroad.
2013 – TFCF launched a Child Protection Day on April 28. Kingdom of Eswatini Branch Office was registered as their third Branch Office abroad.
2014 – Vietnam Branch Office was registered as their fourth Branch Office abroad.
2015 – Cambodia Branch Office was registered as their fifth Branch Office abroad.
2016 – Matsu Branch Office was registered as their 24th Domestic Branch Office.
2017 – Became a full member of Accountable Now as the first eligible organization in Taiwan.
2018 – Jordan Branch Office was registered as their sixth Branch Office abroad.
2019 – Philippines Branch Office was registered as their seventh Branch Office abroad.

Livelihood supports 
With a scene of devastation everywhere in a little town of northern China in 1937, Dr. J. Calvitt Clarke, a foreign Presbyterian minister, tried to save more orphans and homeless away from the war. After going back to the States, he called for the public's attention and established the China's Children Fund (abbreviated as CCF) in Richmond, Virginia, USA. Through a one-on-one sponsorship program, the sponsors contributed a fixed amount on a regular basis to help children in need. Even after TFCF's independence, they still insist to carry on this concept in order to help their sponsored children become self-reliant. TFCF provides them with livelihood supports as well as an opportunity to continue their education through sponsorship programs, scholarships, emergency relief funds, life care, nutrition program, and Self-Reliant Program for Youth.

(1) Sponsorship Program
The sponsorship program is designed to assist children and families in dire need. TFCF has started its Family Sponsorship Program for needy children and families since 2008. In total, TFCF has helped over 235,000 children and youths become self-reliant in Taiwan.

(2) Scholarships and Student Aids
Several types of scholarships and student financial aids are given to the sponsored children and/or their siblings for encouraging them to continue schooling and prevent them from dropping out of school due to financial difficulties.

(3) Emergency Relief Fund
Emergency Relief Fund is distributed when their assisted families encounter any financial difficulties.

(4) Life Care
TFCF provides social resources and volunteers to help low-income families to get through hard times. The services include financial/in-kind assistance, house care, household duties, daycare, and foster care.

(5) Nutrition Program
TFCF has provided Nutrition Program to children from pre-school to high school since Sept. 2009. 1. Grant for meals at school: It includes the three meals. 2. Supplement: It includes milk powder (for age 3–6) and UHT milk. 3. Grant for age 0-3: The milk powder for the child under age 3 should be purchased with caution. With the receipt, the social worker could apply for the grant on behalf of the parents. The grant is distributed based on age and limitations.

(6) Self-Reliant Program for Youth
TFCF has developed the “Self-Reliant Program for Youth” since 2008, including career planning, interpersonal relationship, financial management, vocational consultation, leadership training, and camping scheme.

References 

Children's charities based in Taiwan